is a professional Japanese baseball player. He plays pitcher for the Yokohama DeNA BayStars.

References 

1996 births
Living people
Baseball people from Kyoto Prefecture
Japanese baseball players
Toyo University alumni
Nippon Professional Baseball pitchers
Yokohama DeNA BayStars players